Pune Division (better known as Paschim Maharashtra or Desh) is one of the six administrative divisions of the Indian State of Maharashtra. Pune Division is bound by Konkan Division to the west, Nashik Division to the north, Aurangabad Division to the east, and the state of Karnataka to the south.

History of administrative districts in Pune Division
There have been changes in the names of districts and has seen also the addition of newer districts after India gained Independence in 1947 and also after the state of Maharashtra was formed.
 Notable events include the creation of Sangli district after merging former royal kingdoms of Miraj, Aundh, Sangli, Tasgaon, and Kurundwad.
 The Second event includes the renaming of the erstwhile Poona district as Pune district.
 The Solapur district is under proposal to be divided and a separate Pandharpur district be carved out of existing Solapur district, comprising talukas of Pandharpur, Sangola, Karmala, Mangalwedha, Malshiras and Madha in Solapur district and also talukas of Jath and Atpadi from neighbouring Sangli district, to create a new Pandharpur district.
 The Pune district is under the proposal to be divided and a separate Baramati district be carved out of existing Pune district with the inclusion of the eastern parts of Pune district which include Shirur, Purandar, Daund, Baramati and Indapur talukas as well as Phaltan taluka from neighboring Satara district in the proposed Baramati district.
 The Satara district is under the proposal to be divided and a separate Karad district be carved out of existing Satara district with the inclusion of Karad and Patan as well as talukas of Walwa, Kadegaon and Shirala from neighboring Sangli district in the proposed Karad district.

References

 
Divisions of Maharashtra